"Ahe Nila Saila" is an Odissi classical song composed by the 17th-century saint-poet Salabega, addressing Jagannatha of Puri.

Music 
The traditional composition is set to the Raga Chinta Kamodi and the Tala Jati.

It has been famously rendered by Pt Bhikari Charan Bal.

Lyrics 
In the song, the poet pleads to the deity Jagannatha to save him. Below, the song is transcribed in Odia and English.

References 
 
Odissi music
Odissi music repertoire
17th-century poems
17th-century songs
Culture of Odisha